The Muppet Show 2 is the second soundtrack album released from the TV show of the same name. It follows the same format of sketches and songs as the first album, but also includes guest-star appearances by Bernadette Peters and Peter Sellers.

Track listing

Side A
"The Muppet Show Theme"
"Baby Face"
"There's a New Sound"
"A Monologue by Fozzie Bear"
"Cuanto Le Gusta"
"Who?"
"Time in a Bottle"
"An Editorial by Sam the Eagle"
"Borneo"
"At the Dance"
"Upidee"
"Just One Person" (with Bernadette Peters)

Side B
"Happy Feet"
"Pigs in Space"	 
"I'm Five"
"Sea Chantey"
"New York State of Mind"
"The Pig Calypso"
"When"
"A Gypsy's Violin" (with Peter Sellers)
"Wishing Song"
"Animal Sings Gershwin"
"For What It's Worth"
"We Got Us"
"Closing Theme"

The album also ends with Kermit locking up the theater after everyone is assumed to be out, and he and Miss Piggy leave for dinner.  After about 30 seconds, it is revealed that Fozzie Bear was forgotten about and is left locked in the theater with the lights out. He then starts plaintively repeating "Help". On the original vinyl recording, the side ended in a locked groove loop, so his 'Help' would repeat indefinitely.

Muppet performers
Jim Henson as Kermit the Frog, Rowlf the Dog, Link Hogthrob and Waldorf
Frank Oz as Fozzie Bear, Miss Piggy, Animal and Sam the Eagle
Jerry Nelson as Floyd Pepper, Robin and Dr. Strangepork
Richard Hunt as Scooter, Statler and Janice
Dave Goelz as Gonzo and Zoot
Louise Gold as Zelda Rose and others

Charts and certifications

Weekly charts

Certifications

References

External links

Television soundtracks
The Muppets albums
1978 soundtrack albums
Pye Records albums